Bartonville is a village in Peoria County, Illinois, United States. The population was 6,471 at the 2010 census. Bartonville is a suburb of Peoria and is part of the Peoria, Illinois Metropolitan Statistical Area.

Geography
Bartonville is located at  (40.645387, -89.660364).

Bartonville is situated on U.S. Route 24, Interstate I-474, part of the Illinois River Road: Route of the Voyagers National Scenic Byway.

Demographics

As of the census of 2000, there were 6,310 people, 2,601 households, and 1,810 families residing in the village. The racial makeup of the village was 98.08% White, 0.40% African American, 0.06% Native American, 0.38% Asian, 0.02% Pacific Islander, 0.33% from other races, and 0.73% from two or more races. Hispanic or Latino of any race were 0.97% of the population.

There were 2,601 households, out of which 29.0% had children under the age of 18 living with them, 56.4% were married couples living together, 9.8% had a female householder with no husband present, and 30.4% were non-families. 25.9% of all households were made up of individuals, and 11.5% had someone living alone who was 65 years of age or older. The average household size was 2.43 and the average family size was 2.90.

In the village, the population was spread out, with 23.1% under the age of 18, 7.7% from 18 to 24, 28.5% from 25 to 44, 24.2% from 45 to 64, and 16.5% who were 65 years of age or older. The median age was 39 years. For every 100 females, there were 94.0 males. For every 100 females age 18 and over, there were 90.5 males.

The median income for a household in the village was $40,766, and the median income for a family was $49,909. Males had a median income of $36,324 versus $24,214 for females. The per capita income for the village was $20,580. About 4.3% of families and 7.0% of the population were below the poverty line, including 12.4% of those under age 18 and 1.4% of those age 65 or over.

Important locations
Located directly to the north of the village are the General Wayne Downing Peoria International Airport and the 182d Airlift Wing of the United States Air Force.

The local High School is Limestone Community High School.

The Peoria State Hospital was located in Bartonville until it closed in 1973.

The E.D. Edwards Power Plant, opened in 1960, will retire by the end of 2022 following a federal lawsuit filed in 2013 by local and national environmental groups.

Notable people 

 Mike Dunne, pitcher for several Major League Baseball teams, attended Limestone Community High School in Bartonville.
 Jim Thome, first baseman for several Major League Baseball teams, attended Limestone Community High School in Bartonville.

See also
Peoria State Hospital

References

Villages in Peoria County, Illinois
Villages in Illinois
Peoria metropolitan area, Illinois